Henry Webb Genet (February 27, 1828 – September 6, 1889) was an American lawyer and politician from New York.

Life
Genet was born in Wethersfield, Connecticut, the son of John M. Genet, a French immigrant. The family moved to Albany, New York, when Henry was still an infant. He attended school in Albany, Glens Falls Academy, and New York University. Then he studied law, was admitted to the bar, and practiced in New York City.

Public office
He was a Councilman of New York (7th District) in 1858; an Alderman (17th District) from 1859 to 1863; and President of the Board of Aldermen in 1861. He was Clerk of New York County from 1862 to 1864.

He was a member of the New York State Assembly (New York County, 21st District) in 1867.
He was a member of the New York State Senate (8th District) from 1868 to 1871, sitting in the 91st, 92nd, 93rd and 94th New York State Legislatures.

Conviction
Genet was a member of the Tweed Ring and was convicted in December 1873 for "having, by false and fraudulent means, obtained the signature of Mayor A. Oakey Hall to a warrant for $4,802 for the payment of iron-work alleged to have been supplied by J. McBride Davidson for the Harlem Courthouse." Though Genet had been elected to the State Assembly of 1874, he could not take office after his conviction, so a special election to fill the vacancy was held on January 20, 1874.

Sheriff Matthew T. Brennan let Genet escape and spent 30 days in jail himself.  Genet fled to Canada and then to Europe. In 1878, Genet returned to New York City and surrendered himself. In 1881, he was sentenced to eight months in jail, served his time, and paid a fine of $9,604.

Death
On September 6, 1889, he died of cancer at his home at 100 West 124th Street in New York City and was buried at the Woodlawn Cemetery in The Bronx.

References
 The New York Civil List compiled by Franklin Benjamin Hough, Stephen C. Hutchins and Edgar Albert Werner (1870; pg. 444, 507 and 546)
 Life Sketches of the State Officers, Senators, and Members of the Assembly of the State of New York in 1868 by S. R. Harlow & S. C. Hutchins (pg. 85f)
 Manual of the Corporation of New York by Joseph Shannon (1869; pg. 604 and 651)
 THE RING FRAUDS; CONVICTION OF HENRY W. GENET in NYT on December 20, 1873
 THE ESCAPE OF GENET in NYT on December 23, 1873
 A RING FUGITIVE'S RETURN in NYT on February 5, 1878
 HENRY GENET SENTENCED in NYT on March 13, 1881
 HENRY W. GENET DEAD in NYT on September 7, 1889

1828 births
1889 deaths
Democratic Party New York (state) state senators
People from Wethersfield, Connecticut
New York University alumni
New York City Council members
American politicians convicted of fraud
Democratic Party members of the New York State Assembly
Burials at Woodlawn Cemetery (Bronx, New York)
New York (state) politicians convicted of crimes
19th-century American politicians